is a Quasi-National Park in eastern Hokkaidō, Japan. Established in 2021, the park spans the municipalities of Akkeshi, Hamanaka, Kushiro, and Shibecha. It subsumes and replaces the former Akkeshi Prefectural Natural Park, established in 1955.

Flora within the park include the Sakhalin fir, Erman's birch, Arctic iris, Sendai-hagi, Ezo-kanzō, and small cranberry; fauna, the Japanese crane, white-tailed eagle, Steller's sea eagle, whooper swan, Leach's storm petrel, and tufted puffin.

See also
 National Parks of Japan
 List of Natural Monuments of Japan (Hokkaidō)
 List of Ramsar sites in Japan
 Wildlife Protection Areas in Japan

References

External links

  Map of Natural Parks of Hokkaidō
  Map of Akkeshi-Kiritappu-Konbumori Quasi-National Park

Parks and gardens in Hokkaido
Akkeshi, Hokkaido
Hamanaka, Hokkaido
Kushiro, Hokkaido (town)
Shibecha, Hokkaido
Protected areas established in 2021
2021 establishments in Japan